James Batman is a 1966 Filipino Batman/James Bond cinematic spoof produced by Dolores H. Vera and released by Sampaguita Pictures. It stars the Philippine comedian Dolphy as Batman and James Bond and Boy Alano as "Rubin".

Premise
An evil organization called the CLAW has threatened nuclear annihilation on the rest of the world unless all countries submit to its rule within five days. Presenting a united front, an alliance of countries tap James Bond and Batman (and Robin) to stop the threat. However, both Bond and Batman play brinkmanship with each other. As the hour to doomsday winds down, the heroes are eventually forced to work together. Little do the protagonists know that the real enemy is closer than they think.

Cast

Dolphy as James Bond/Batman
Boy Alano as Robin
Shirley Moreno
Bella Flores
Diane Balen
Elsa Boufard
Nori Dalisay
Johnny Ysmail Jr.
Lynn D’Arce  
Jose Morelos
Ben Medina
Joy Del Sol
Tessa Concepcion

See also
 Alyas Batman en Robin
 Alyas Batman at Robin
 Batman Fights Dracula

References

External links

James Batman at Teleport City

1966 films
1966 independent films
1960s parody films
1960s superhero films
Parody films based on James Bond films
Parodies of Batman
Tagalog-language films
Sampaguita Pictures films
Unofficial Batman films
1966 comedy films
1960s American films